There were 100 cyclists signed up for the 1906 Tour de France, but only 76 of them came to the start. One of the absentees was Henri Cornet, winner of the 1904 Tour de France. Four cyclists were Belgian, one was Luxembourgian (later winner François Faber), two were German, and the rest were French. Louis Trousselier, winner of the 1905 Tour de France, was present. The riders were not grouped in teams, but some cyclists had the same sponsor, even though they were not allowed to work together. Before the race started, most was expected from Cadolle, Aucouturier, Georget, Pottier, Trousselier, Dortignac and Petit-Breton.

As in 1905, the cyclists were divided in two categories, the coureurs de vitesse and the coureurs sur machines poinçonnées, where the riders in the first category were allowed to change bicycles, which could be an advantage in the mountains, where they could use a bicycle with lower gears. In 1905, sponsors had not been so enthusiastic about entering their cyclists in this category, but in 1906 they had learned that it had a commercial advantage to have cyclists starting in the poinçonnées category, because the average French citizen could identify more with them. In 1906, more than half of the cyclists started in the poinçonnées category, including Lucien Petit-Breton, one of the pre-favourites.

By starting number

By nationality

References

1906 Tour de France
1906